Bernardo Segall (August 4, 1911 – November 26, 1993) was a Brazilian-born American composer and concert pianist.

Life 
Bernardo Segall made his professional debut as a pianist at age 9 in his native Campinas, Brazil. At Age 16 he traveled to the United States, where he studied with Alexander Siloti and, at 21, made his American debut at New York's Town Hall, later performing in orchestras such as the New York Philharmonic. Segall also had an uncle who was a well-known painter in Brazil, Lasar Segall. In addition to performing as a concert pianist, Bernardo Segall also maintained an additional career as a composer for theater, ballet, film and television. Segal was married to dancer and choreographer Valerie Bettis for 12 years, and he composed many pieces that she danced in. He scored films such as The Great St. Louis Bank Robbery starring Steve McQueen, The Luck of Ginger Coffey and Custer of the West, and wrote music for TV series including Columbo, Airwolf and the 1976 documentary To Fly!. Segall died in 1993.

Selected filmography
The Great St. Louis Bank Robbery (1959)
The Luck of Ginger Coffey (1964)
Hallucination Generation (1967)
Custer of the West (1967)
Loving (1970)
Night Slaves (1970)
The Garden of Aunt Isabel (1971)
Moon of the Wolf (1972)
The Girl Most Likely to... (1973)
Homebodies (1974)

External links 
 
Bernardo Segall LA Times Obituary

References 

People from Campinas
1911 births
1993 deaths
Brazilian emigrants to the United States
Brazilian film score composers
Brazilian composers
American male composers
20th-century American composers
20th-century American pianists
American male pianists
20th-century American male musicians
Jewish classical pianists